Gadde Ruthvika Shivani (born 26 March 1997) is an Indian badminton player who currently plays singles. She trains at the Gopichand Badminton Academy.

Childhood and Early Training
Gadde Ruthvika Shivani, the daughter of G. Bhavani Prasad and G. Prameela Rani, was born in a Telugu family on 26 March 1997. Her father is a small business man and her mother is a homemaker and Shivani's elder brother is G. S. Chaitanya Prasad. Shivani getting interested in playing badminton at the age of five, she used to go along with his father to play with club members at Khammam's Sequel Resorts. Her father and his friends noticed her keen interest to the sport, from then she started playing it every single day and make it as a career.

In 2002, Shivani initially took in the nuts and bolts of the game with the direction of club coach Prem Singh at Khammam's Sequel Resorts. Later, she joined in the Sports Authority Academy, Khammam, in 2004 under the guidance of coach G. Sudhakar Reddy till 2011. During her training she sharpened her repertoire of mix-and-match shots to bait and confuse her opponents. One of the others things she did was to play singles and doubles with boys. While their physicality made Shivani work harder, her techniques refined her game, making her stand out.

Soon after Shivani joined in the Pullela Gopichand Badminton Academy in 2012, she won several medals after joining in the Gopichand Badminton Academy, one of the biggest triumph is winning the women's singles title in Russian Grand Prix. About Shivani's performance at the Russian Grand Prix, Gopichand said: "She had the habit of playing against the boys in her early days". "So, her fitness and power is automatically developed and it is likely to make the difference from the other students of this academy. And after she joined the academy, I did not overwrite her game style. Rather I tried to polish it".

Shivani was National Champion at sub-junior, junior, senior level categories in all age groups and in all formats of badminton events, respectively she won 115 national medals. In the international level she won 20 medals. Shivani completed her schooling from Harvest Public School, Khammam. She completed her 11th, 12th standards from Jubilee Hills Public School, Hyderabad and B.Com from St. Ann's College for Women, at present she is pursuing her M.B.A in the same college located in Hyderabad.

Career
In the international circuit, Shivani made her first international sub-junior debut in 2010, she was a bronze medallist in women's doubles category at the Badminton Asia Youth U17 & U15 Championships held in Chiba, Japan, that was her first medal in international level. In the same year she was a silver medallist in women's doubles category at the Li-Ning Singapore Youth International held in Singapore.
In 2011, Shivani was a silver medallist in women's singles category at the Badminton Asia Youth U17 & U15 Championships held in Chiba, Japan. She was also a silver medallist in women's doubles category at the DJARUM SIRNAS REG.IV FLY POWER PERTAMINA JATIM OPEN held in Surabaya, Indonesia.

2011
In 2011, Shivani made her first international junior debut at Ramenskoe Junior International held in Ramenskoe, Russia. She vanquished Russian Player Evgeniya Kosetskaya and won women's singles title. She was also a bronze medallist in women's doubles. At Asian Junior Championships she was a bronze medallist in mixed team event.

2012
In 2012, Sushant Chipalkatti Memorial India Junior International held in Pune, Maharastra. She won the women's singles title by defeating Rituparna Das in straight sets and also won the women's doubles title.

2013
In the 2013 Indian Badminton League, She was the team member of the Awadhe Warriors. Her team lost in finals against Hyderabad HotShots and finished as runner's-up. Shivani won women's singles title at Sushant Chipalkatti Memorial India Junior International held in Pune, Maharastra. By defeating Liang Xiaoyu in finals. She won in women's doubles at Vankina Anjana Devi Memorial All India Senior Ranking Badminton Tournament held in Hyderabad, Telangana.

2014
In December, Shivani won the Tata Open India International women's singles title after beating her opponent Arundhati Pantawane in the final. This was her first international challenge title held in Mumbai, Maharastra. On 7 September 2014 she won her third consecutive year of winning women's singles title in Sushant Chipalkatti Memorial India Junior International held in Pune, Maharastra defeating her opponent Karthik Reshma in the final. Winner in women’s singles at All India Senior Ranking Badminton Tournament held in Gandhidham, Gujarat.

2015
At the 2015 December, Yonex-Sunrise Bangladesh Open International held in Dhaka, Bangladesh. She won the women's singles title by defeating top seeded player Iris Wang of United States. In October, Sofia, Bulgaria she was a bronze medallist in women's singles at the Babolat Bulgarian International. In September, playing at the Sushant Chipalkatti Memorial India Junior International held in Pune, Maharastra. She defeated second seeded player Supamart Mingchua in the final and winning the women's singles title for the fourth consecutive year. At Radhey Shyam Gupta Memorial All India Senior Ranking Badminton Tournament held in Bareilly, Uttar Pradesh she was winner in women's singles.

2016
At the 2016 South Asian Games held in Guwahati and Shillong, she won two gold medals, in women's team and women's singles. Rising star Shivani created the biggest upset by defeating P. V. Sindhu in straight games and won the women's singles title. She was a women's team member in India's national team at the 2016 Uber Cup and secured bronze medal in 2016 Thomas & Uber Cup World Team Championships Finals held in Kunshan, China. In the quarter finals she defeated Thailand's top player Nichaon Jindapol by 21-18, 21-16 with that victory Indian women's team secured bronze medal in Uber Cup. Later, they lost in semi-finals against china. In the 2016 Premier Badminton league, Shivani was the team member of the Mumbai Rockets. Her team finished as runner's-up after losing in finals against Delhi Acers. 
On 9 October 2016, Shivani won Russian Open women's singles title, beating her opponent from Russia Evgeniya Kosetskaya in finals. This is Shivani's maiden Grand Prix title held in Vladivostok, Russia. Shivani was a silver medallist in Sats-Yonex Sunrise India International Series held in Hyderabad, Telangana. In Pune, Maharashtra she was winner in women’s singles at V. V. Natu Memorial All India Senior Ranking Badminton Tournament.

International achievements (senior)

 Grand Prix
 International Challenge
 International Series

International achievements (junior)

 Junior International Grand Prix
 Junior International Series

International achievements (sub-junior)

 Continental Junior Championships

International Career overview

* Statistics were last updated on 9 December 2017.

National achievements

National sub-junior/junior/senior medals (31)

Personal life
Ruthvika Shivani has been employed with Bharat Petroleum Corporation Limited (BPCL) since 23 November 2015. Now she is in EXECUTIVE (SPORTS) post at  Hyderabad, Telangana office.

See also
 Badminton in India
 India national badminton team
 Gopichand Badminton Academy
 Pullela Gopichand

References

External links
 
 Gadde Ruthvika Shivani at Gopichand Badminton Academy
 Interview with Gadde Ruthvika Shivani – "Rising Stars - Upcoming star in Indian badminton Ruthvika Shivani" on Dreamaboutsports
 Gadde Ruthvika Shivani interview on Badminton-Unlimited
 Twitter Official page

Indian female badminton players
Living people
1997 births
21st-century Indian women
21st-century Indian people
Sportswomen from Vijayawada, India
Racket sportspeople from Vijayawada
Badminton players at the 2018 Commonwealth Games
Commonwealth Games gold medallists for India
Commonwealth Games medallists in badminton
Badminton players at the 2014 Summer Youth Olympics
South Asian Games gold medalists for India
South Asian Games medalists in badminton
Medallists at the 2018 Commonwealth Games